Rebel is a 1985 Australian musical drama directed by Michael Jenkins and starring Matt Dillon, Debra Byrne, and Bryan Brown. It is set in World War Two.

No Names No Pack Drill
The movie was based on the play No Names, No Packdrill, by Bob Herbert, uncle of Louis Nowra.

The play had its premiere in 1979 at the University of New England.

The play was performed by the Sydney Theatre Company in 1980 starring Mel Gibson and Noni Hazlehurst, directed by George Ogilvie. The production was so popular the season was extended at the Theatre Royal.

It has been revived several times, notably in 2006.

Production
Considerable changes were made from the play, including turning the female lead from a postal worker into a singer in a female band. It was originally hoped to cast Olivia Newton-John in this role but Debra Byrne was cast instead and made a great personal success in it.

Director Mike Jenkins decided to push the musical aspect, and went for a stylised approach in collaboration with designer Brian Thomson. The manager Matt Dillon, who was imported to play the lead, did not like the approach, saying it was too much like a Francis Ford Coppola movie - which Thomson took as a compliment. He wanted his client to appear in a straight period film closer to Breaker Morant. However Jenkins and Thomson's vision prevailed.

Reception
The film was not a success. Director Mike Jenkins later said that:
It's funny, Rebel has attracted some fierce critiques from intellectuals who subsequently liked other things that I've done. But it also won five AFI awards and was the most nominated film of its year. It was a curious piece; it didn't altogether work. I was interested in it because of the basic story about the American boy who wants to desert. It said something about Australia and Sydney in World War II.

Soundtrack

A Soundtrack was released in December 1985 and credited to Matt Dillon and Debbie Byrne. The album peaked at number 75 on the Kent Music Report.

References

External links

Rebel at The New York Times

1985 films
Australian musical drama films
Australian films based on plays
Films about deserters
Films scored by Chris Neal (songwriter)
1980s English-language films
Films directed by Michael Jenkins
1980s Australian films